The Canal Creek air crash occurred on 19 December 1943 when a C-47 aircraft of the 22d Troop Carrier Squadron 374th Troop Carrier Group crashed at Canal Creek, Queensland, fifty kilometres north of Rockhampton, killing all 31 people on board.

The aircraft was enroute from Townsville to Brisbane with a scheduled stop in Rockhampton. The crash is believed to be caused by a fire in one of the engines which caused an explosion, destroying part of the aircraft causing it to disintegrate and crash.

Those killed included twenty United States Armed Forces personnel, eight Australian Defence Force personnel, an Australian war photographer, a representative from the YMCA and an adjutant from the Salvation Army.

Due to wartime censorship, there was very little press coverage of the accident, with the few newspaper articles that were published focusing on the non-combatants on-board such as Harold Dick (war photographer), Nigel James MacDonald (YMCA) and William Tibbs (Salvation Army). However, those stories only mentioned that they had been "killed in a plane accident" with no specific details about the disaster.

With so many locals still unaware of the disaster at the turn of the century, Yeppoon resident John Millroy began campaigning for a permanent memorial at the crash site to commemorate those who died.  After securing $14,000 in government funding, a monument was unveiled by World War II servicemen Neville Hewitt and Yeppoon RSL president Wayne Carter on 16 June 2012.  Rockhampton mayor Margaret Strelow and Queensland Governor Penelope Wensley attended the ceremony.  Wensley said it was good the tragedy was being remembered while Strelow praised Millroy for his part in organising the memorial.

Annual memorial services are now held at the crash site.  A 75th anniversary commemoration was held in 2018.

The Canal Creek air crash occurred just a month after the Rewan air crash near Rolleston, in which 19 Australian and American personnel were killed and six months after the Bakers Creek air crash near Mackay in which 40 military personnel were killed.

References

Further reading
 

1943 disasters in Australia
Accidents and incidents involving the Douglas C-47 Skytrain
Aviation accidents and incidents in Queensland
Shire of Livingstone
1943 in Australia